The 1985 Virginia Slims of Utah was a women's tennis tournament played on indoor carpet courts at the Sports Mall in Salt Lake City, Utah, United States that was part of the Category 1+ tier of the 1985 WTA Tour. It was the fourth edition of the tournament and was played from September 9 through September 15, 1985. Sixth-seeded Stephanie Rehe won the singles title.

Finals

Singles
 Stephanie Rehe defeated  Camille Benjamin 6–2, 6–4
 It was Rehe's 1st singles title of her career.

Doubles
 Svetlana Parkhomenko /  Larisa Neiland defeated  Rosalyn Fairbank /  Beverly Mould 7–5, 6–2

References

External links
 ITF tournament edition details

Virginia Slims Of Utah, 1985
Virginia Slims of Utah
Virginia Slims of Utah
Virginia Slims of Utah
Virginia Slims of Utah